HuneX is a video game developer formed as a partnership between NEC Home Electronics, Ltd. and Human in 1992. HuneX mainly produces Bishōjo games and Otome games.

Games
77: Beyond the Milky Way
Aikagi: Nukumori to Hidamari no Naka de
All Japan Women's Pro Wrestling: Queen of Queens
Angel's Feather
Ayakashibito Portable
Baldr Force EXE
Baldr Bullet Equilibrium
Bijin Dokei Portable
Biz Taiken DS Series: Kigyoudou - Inshoku -
Blue Breaker (series)
Canvas 3: Awairo no Sketch
Canvas 3: Nanairo no Kiseki
Chanter#: Kimi no Uta ga Todoitara
Clannad (PlayStation 2 version)
Clover Heart's
Dear My Sun!!: Musuko Ikusei Kyousoukyoku
Duel Savior Destiny
 EPHEMERAL: Fantasy On Dark/ Residents of the Dark 
 EPHEMERAL: Miniature Garden
Fate/stay night: Realta Nua / Tobidase! Toraburu Hanafuda Douchuuki
First Kiss Story
Formation Soccer '95: Della Serie A
Gokujō!! Mecha Mote Iinchō series
Gokujō!! Mecha Mote Iinchō: MM Town de Miracle Change!
Gokujō!! Mecha Mote Iinchō: MM My Best Friend!
Haru no Ashioto
Hayate no Gotoku! series
Hayate the Combat Butler|Hayate no Gotoku!: Boku ga Romeo de Romeo ga Boku de
Hayate no Gotoku!: Ojō-sama Produce Daisakusen Bokuiro ni Somare!
Hayate no Gotoku!!: Nightmare Paradise
Higurashi no Naku Koro ni Matsuri
Houkago no Love Beat
Industrial Spy: Operation Espionage
Izumo: Takeki Tsurugi no Senki
J-League Tremendous Soccer '94
Katakamuna: Ushinawareta Ingaritsu
Kazoku Keikaku
Komorebi no Namikimichi: Utsurikawaru Kisetsu no Naka de
Kyuuketsu Kitan Moonties
Like Life Every Hour
LoveSongs ADV: Riho Futaba
Lucian Bee's: Resurrection Supernova
Lucian Bee's: Evil Violet
Lucian Bee's: Justice Yellow
MagusTale Eternity: Sekaiju to Koi suru Mahou Tsukai
Mahoroba Stories
Mainichi Kokorobics: DS Therapy
Majokko a la mode: Tonaete, Koi no Mahou!
Majokko a la mode II: Mahou to Ken no Struggle
Mizuiro
Ore no Shita de Agake
Otometeki Koi Kakumei Love Revo!!
Party Girls
Pinky:St Kira-Kira Rainbow Pack
PW: ProjectWitch
Real Rode
Simple series
Simple 2000 Series DC Vol. 01: The Renai Adventure - Bittersweet Fools
Simple 2000 Series DC Vol. 02: The Renai Simulation - Natsuiro Cerebration
Simple 2000 Series DC Vol. 03: The Renai Simulation 2 - Fureai
Simple 2000 Series DC Vol. 04: The Renai Adventure - Okaeri!
Simple 2000 Series Vol. 2: The Party Game
Simple 2000 Series Vol. 8: The Tennis
Simple 2000 Series Vol. 9: The Renai Adventure - Bittersweet Fools
Simple 2000 Series Vol. 13: The Renai Adventure - Garasu no Mori
Simple 2000 Series Vol. 23: The Puzzle Collection 2000-Mon
Simple 2000 Series Vol. 26: The Pinball x 3
Simple 2000 Series Vol. 38: The Yuujou Adventure - Hotaru Tamashii
Simple 2000 Series Vol. 44: The Hajimete no RPG - Densetsu no Keishousha
Simple 2000 Series Vol. 45: The Koi to Namida to, Tsuioku to... - Thread Colors: Sayonara no Mukou Gawa
Simple 2000 Series Vol. 53: The Camera Kozou
Simple 2000 Series Vol. 76: The Hanasou Eikaiwa no Tabi
Simple 2000 Series Vol. 77: The Hanasou Kankokugo no Tabi
Simple 2000 Series Vol. 89: The Party Game 2
Simple 2000 Series Vol. 92: The Noroi no Game
Simple 2000 Series Vol. 104: The Robot Tsukurouze! - Gekitou! Robot Fight
Simple 2000 Series Ultimate Vol. 1: Love*Smash! Super Tennis Players
Simple 2000 Series Ultimate Vol. 5: Love*Mahjong!
Simple 2000 Series Ultimate Vol. 10: Love Songs - Idol ga Classmate
Simple 2000 Series Ultimate Vol. 11: Wandaba Style
Simple 2000 Series Ultimate Vol. 20: Love*Mahjong! 2
Simple 2000 Series Ultimate Vol. 26: Love*Smash! 5.1 - Tennis Robo no Hanran
Simple DS Series Vol. 6: The Party Game
Simple 2500 Series Portable!! Vol. 2: The Tennis
Simple 2500 Series Portable!! Vol. 8: Dokodemo Gal Mahjong
Snoopy to Issho ni DS Eigo Lesson
Snow
Solfege: Sweet Harmony
Soul Link Extension
Starry Sky (PlayStation Portable ports)
Steam Prison
Thread Colors: Sayonara no Mukou Gawa
Togainu no Chi
Tomoyo After: It's a Wonderful Life - CS Edition (PlayStation 2 version)
Tsuki wa Higashi ni Hi wa Nishi ni: Operation Sanctuary
Vitamin X
Vitamin Y
Vitamin Z
Vitamin X to Z
Wakabayashi Fumie no DS Kabu Lesson
Welcome to Pia Carrot (series)
Wind: A Breath of Heart
Yoake Mae yori Ruriiro na
Zettai Karen Children DS: Dai-4 no Children

Related Lists
List of Dreamcast games
List of Nintendo DS games
List of PC-FX games
List of PlayStation 2 games
List of PlayStation Portable games

References

Japanese companies established in 1992
Video game companies established in 1992
Video game companies of Japan
Video game development companies